Dahnohabe (also, Dah-no-habe and Do-no-ha-be) is a former Pomo settlement in Lake County, California. It was located on the west side of Clear Lake; its precise location is unknown.

The Dahnohabe Pomo were among several groups of Pomo from the Clear Lake area who met with George Gibbs in 1852. According to Gibbs, the name means "stone mountain".

References

Former settlements in Lake County, California
Former Native American populated places in California
Lost Native American populated places in the United States
Pomo villages